Guillermo Sevilla Sacasa (September 11, 1908, Leon, Nicaragua – December 16, 1997 Potomac, Maryland, United States ) was the Nicaraguan ambassador to the United States from 1943 until July 19, 1979, when President Anastasio Somoza Debayle was forced into exile following the Nicaraguan Revolution. As a result of his record-breaking service as ambassador in Washington, D.C., he was appointed Dean of the Diplomatic Corps, a position he held from January 1958 to July 1979.

He was the son of J. Ramón Sevilla Castellón and wife Dolores Sacasa Sacasa, daughter of Roberto Sacasa, 44th and 46th President of Nicaragua, and wife and cousin Ángela Sacasa Cuadra.

Known as the "world's most decorated ambassador", he was a judge and president of the lower chamber of National Congress of Nicaragua. He also served as Ambassador to the U.S. for 36 years under eight American Presidents and eleven Secretaries of State, a singularly unique and unprecedented achievement, unmatched to this day.

In 1943, Sevilla-Sacasa married Lillian Somoza Debayle, born in León, Nicaragua, on May 3, 1921, the daughter of Anastasio Somoza García, the 65th and 69th President of Nicaragua, and Salvadora Debayle Sacasa, and had nine children.

References

1908 births
1997 deaths
Nicaraguan people of Spanish descent
Ambassadors of Nicaragua to the United States
Deans of the Diplomatic Corps to the United States
Cold War diplomats
Nicaraguan judges
Presidents of the Chamber of Deputies (Nicaragua)
People from Potomac, Maryland